Albert Harper (26 January 1923 – 29 December 1992) was an Australian rules footballer in the Victorian Football League (VFL).

He played in the Essendon premiership teams in 1946 and 1950.

External links

Essendonfc.com.au profile

Australian rules footballers from Victoria (Australia)
Essendon Football Club players
Essendon Football Club Premiership players
Castlemaine Football Club players
1923 births
1992 deaths
Two-time VFL/AFL Premiership players